Yantra is a village in Dryanovo Municipality, in Gabrovo Province, in northern central Bulgaria with a population of 108 as of 2013.

References

Villages in Gabrovo Province